Millicent Agboegbulem (born 18 June 1983) is a Nigerian amateur boxer who won a bronze medal at the 2018 Commonwealth Games.

Career 
Millicent competed at the 2018 Commonwealth Games. She won a bronze medal in the middleweight event against Caitlin Parker.

References

External links 
Millicent Agboegbulem

1983 births
Living people
Boxers at the 2018 Commonwealth Games
Commonwealth Games bronze medallists for Nigeria
Commonwealth Games medallists in boxing
Nigerian women boxers
Middleweight boxers
Medallists at the 2018 Commonwealth Games